Camille De Pazzis  is a French actress most famous for starring in the French series La vie devant nous. She is also a face of Lancôme.

She has co-starred in the American television series Last Resort and The Following. In 2015 De Pazzis was cast as Annie in the third and final season of Hemlock Grove.

Filmography

References

External links
 

French film actresses
French people of Italian descent
French television actresses
Living people
1978 births
21st-century French actresses
20th-century French actresses